Buda-Kashalyova is a town in Gomel Region, Belarus. It has a population of 8,800 (2005 estimate).

History
It was first mentioned in chronicles from the first half of 1824 as village Buda in Mogilev Governorate. Its population was 500 (1890s).

During World War II, Buda-Kashalyova was under German occupation from 15 August 1941 until 27 November 1943.

References

Towns in Belarus
Populated places in Gomel Region
Minsk Voivodeship
Rogachyovsky Uyezd
Buda-Kashalyova District